United Nations Security Council Resolution 53, adopted on July 7, 1948, took into consideration a telegram from the United Nations Mediator dated 5 July 1948, the resolution addresses an urgent appeal to the interested parties to accept in principle the prolonging of the truce for such period as would be decided upon in consultation with the Mediator.

The resolution was approved with eight votes, while the Ukrainian SSR, Soviet Union and Syria abstained.

See also
List of United Nations Security Council Resolutions 1 to 100 (1946–1953)

References
Text of the Resolution at undocs.org

External links
 

 0053
 0053
1948 Arab–Israeli War
1948 in Mandatory Palestine
1948 in Israel
July 1948 events
United Nations Security Council resolutions concerning Palestine